Hanover is an unincorporated census-designated place located in the town of Plymouth, Rock County, Wisconsin, United States. It is west of Janesville and east of Orfordville. As of the 2020 census, its population was 179.

History
Hanover was originally called Bass Creek. The present name is after Hanover, Germany, the native home of a large share of the early settlers. A post office was established as Bass Creek in 1856 and renamed Hanover in 1859; the post office closed in 2014.

Demographics

References

Census-designated places in Rock County, Wisconsin
Census-designated places in Wisconsin